Bowery Songs is a live album by American singer and musician Joan Baez, released in 2005.  It was recorded during Baez' set at Manhattan's Bowery Ballroom.

Track listings 
 "Finlandia" (Jean Sibelius, Georgia Harkness, Lloyd Stone) – 2:08
 "Rexroth's Daughter" (Greg Brown) – 5:00
 "Deportee (Plane Wreck at Los Gatos)" (Woody Guthrie, Martin Hoffman) – 5:24
 "Joe Hill" (Alfred Hayes, Earl Robinson) – 4:18
 "Christmas in Washington" (Steve Earle) – 5:17
 "Farewell, Angelina" (Bob Dylan) – 3:36
 "Motherland" (Natalie Merchant) – 5:16
 "Carrickfergus" (traditional, Alan Connaught) –5:41
 "Jackaroe" (traditional) –5:07
 "Seven Curses" (Dylan) –5:26
 "Dink's Song" (traditional) –4:37
 "Silver Dagger" (traditional) – 3:52
 "It's All Over Now, Baby Blue" (Dylan) – 4:26
 "Jerusalem" (Earle) – 4:17

Personnel
Joan Baez – vocals, guitar
George Javori – drums, percussion
Graham Maby – bass, background vocals
Duke McVinnie – guitar, background vocals
Erik Della Penna – banjo, guitar, lap steel guitar, background vocals

Joan Baez live albums
2005 live albums
Albums recorded at the Bowery Ballroom